A dry bulk cargo barge is a barge designed to carry freight such as coal, finished steel or its ingredients, grain, sand or gravel, or similar materials. Barges are usually constructed of steel. They have an outer hull, an internal void that is fitted with heavy struts and cross braces or scantlings, and an internal cargo box. The outer hull of a barge can come in one of two configurations. A rake barge has a curved bow to provide less resistance when being pushed and is usually placed at the head of the tow. A box barge is usually placed in the center and rear of the tow and can hold more cargo.

Such barges can be equipped with covers of various types if the cargo is weather-sensitive (finished steel or grain). Generally, these covers are fabricated of fiberglass or steel. They can be lifted or rolled away for access to the barge hold, or cargo box.

In 2004, the dry bulk cargo barge fleet on the Mississippi River System (Mississippi, Gulf Intracoastal Waterway east and west, Ohio, Illinois, Missouri Rivers, etc.) stood at 5,836 open hoppers and 11,572 covered hoppers, for a total of 17,408, according to the Criton Corporation. Smaller barge fleets also operate on the East (Hudson River, etc.) and West coasts (Columbia River, Sacramento River, etc.) of the United States, and in numerous countries including India.

Dry bulk cargo barges are typically operated and maintained with efficiency and environmental stewardship in mind. Typically, an informal set of industry best practices are applicable, including:

Barge loading

Barge loading should be conducted in a manner that minimizes the amount of cargo spilled onto the deck. The loading process is the responsibility of the loader operator at the loading facility.

Barge unloading

Barge unloading should be conducted in a manner that minimizes the amount of cargo spilled onto the deck. The unloading process is the responsibility of the unloader operator at the unloading facility.  Unloading can be done with a Grab Bucket Barge Unloader or a Continuous Barge Unloader (CBU).  The Grab Bucket system employs a clamshell bucket suspended by a set of hoisting cables, with a separate set of control cables that open and close the bucket.  The CBU is a series of buckets supported between two strands of roller chain, running in a continuous loop.

Cargo spillage

The nature of the dry bulk commodity business is such that some amount of cargo spillage is typically unavoidable. In such cases the following practices are standard:

When possible, cargo residue will be swept and shoveled back into the hopper, provided cargo is the same.

If the current cargo is not the same as the residue remaining on the barge deck, the residue should be swept up against the barge coaming and in some cases may be shoveled and placed into a container or bag.

If the quantity of cargo exceeds an amount that can be safely cleaned, then a barge report will be filed and the cargo will be cleaned at a facility.

Trash on deck

Trash that may be left on deck such as junk line or garbage is bagged and placed so that exposure to rain or the possibility of being washed off of tow is eliminated.

 
Below deck water

Barge hulls are maintained to minimize the accumulation of river water below deck.

If a barge develops a detectable leak, crew members will go below deck and install a temporary patch, known as a shingle.

The hull will be repaired when possible.

Water that accumulates in void tank generally needs to be removed. When this is the case, the following best practices are applicable:

Visually inspect the water in the void for a sheen.

If no sheen is detected, the water is pumped from the void tank into the river. The crew will observe the water surrounding the tow for any sign of a visible sheen.

In the event a visible sheen is detected, the pump is immediately turned off (provided the barge is in no danger of sinking.) and the corrective action process as described in the VGP is implemented.

Barge inspection

When a barge is picked up by a boat, the on watch deck crew does an inspection of each barge that includes the following:

Each void tank is inspected for water. If water is found it is visually inspected for a sheen.

The deck of each barge is visually inspected for cargo spillage or trash.

Barge inspections are recorded on a barge inspection form.

It is common for a barge to be handled by multiple vessels and even multiple vessels each barge voyage (empty to empty).

Barge inspection forms are maintained shore side.

At least once every watch, the deck crew inspects the void tanks of each barge to ensure that no water is being taken on.

Deck scaling

Barge decks are maintained to minimize the formation of large rust scales, this is typically accomplished by painting the deck as needed.

Terminology related to the dry bulk cargo barge industry:

Above Waterline- The portion of a barge that is out of the water at a given time. This will vary based on whether or not the barge is loaded or empty.

Barge- Non-powered cargo or work vessel.

Barge Pump- Small portable pump used for removing water.

Barge Voyage- The time from which an empty barge is placed in tow, until it has been loaded, emptied and returned to a fleet. May include stops in a terminal fleet, cleaning and/or repair.

Barge Washing- Using water to clean cargo from the deck and/or hopper of a barge. Typically conducted at a barge washing facility.

Below Waterline- The portion of a barge that is below the water at a given time. This will vary based on whether or not the barge is loaded or empty

Boot- Fitting attached to the end of a suction hose on a barge pump that prevents large particles from being suctioned.

Cargo Box- Open hold on a barge for cargo

Cargo Residue- A quantity of product remaining on a barge deck on in a hopper.

Cargo Trimming- Shifting or rearranging cargo to level a barge.

Coaming- High sides around an open hopper barge.

Cover- Fits over the coaming. Used to protect weather sensitive cargo such as grain. Large, typically constructed of steel or fiberglass. Depending on style, they can be lifted off by crane or rolled away for access to the hopper.

Cover Hatch-  Lid which allows access to the cargo hopper through the cover. Typically used for cargo loading.

Deck- The work area and walkways of a barge.

Dry Dock- Structure used to raise a vessel out of the water so as to expose all parts of the hull for inspection, repairs or painting.

Draft- Vertical distance between the water line and the bottom of the vessel hull.

Empty Barge- A barge without cargo.

Fleet- Group of moored barges

Fleeting- Service that includes mooring of barges and associated shifting.

Fleet tug- Or Harbor Boat- small towboat used for fleeting.

Freeboard- Vertical distance from the water line to the deck.

Hatch- Opening in a deck for maintenance.

Hatch lid- Covers the hatch opening.

Hopper- Open hold on a barge for cargo.

Hull- The frame or body of a vessel, excluding the bulk heads, deck or mechanical equipment.

Inboard- Towards the center of the vessel.

Inland Waters- Waterways inside the United States.

Integrated tow- Barges of mixed cargo.

Jumbo Barge- Common size for dry cargo barge, 35’x195’ or 200’

Knuckle- Curved steel plate on side and bottom of barges.

Lightering- Removing product from a barge to achieve the desired draft.

Line Boat- Live on boat making regular trips.

Line Deck- Open deck at the end of a barge.

Loaded Barge- A barge containing cargo.

Mooring- The act of securing a vessel.

Outboard- Towards the outside of the vessel.

Rearrange Tow- To move barges within a tow.

Shifting- Moving barges within a fleet or from a terminal fleet to a loader or unloader.

Shingle- Temporary plug to stop a leak below deck.

Tier- Row of barges across the width of a fleet.

Terminal- A facility that conducts either loading or unloading operations.

Terminal Fleet- Group of moored barges at or near a terminal.

Turning- Two boats meeting and exchanging tows.

Tow- Group of barges lashed together for pushing.

Tow Work- Assembling and connecting barges together.

Void- Closed hull space providing buoyancy.

Watch- Working shift of a vessel crew member.

Western Rivers- The Mississippi river system.

See also
 Bulk carrier - larger vessels that carry the same types of materials but may be self-propelled or ocean worthy
 Buhler - Manufacturer of barge loading and unloading equipment]
 Heyl & Patterson Inc. - manufacturer of various types of barge unloaders
 Hopper barge
 Liquid cargo barge - carries wet products such as vegetable oils, orange juice, liquid fuels, etc

Barges